A Shrewsbury cake or Shrewsbury biscuit is a classic English dessert, named after Shrewsbury, the county town of Shropshire. They are made from dough that contains sugar, flour, egg, butter and lemon zest; dried fruit is also often added. Shrewsbury cakes can be small in size for serving several at a time, or large for serving as a dessert in themselves.

History
The earliest known written reference for Shrewsbury cakes dates to 1602. The original cakes, delicate and fragile in texture, are no longer made commercially. These cakes were very different from the modern Shrewsbury biscuits which are still handcrafted in Shrewsbury.

The playwright William Congreve mentioned Shrewsbury cakes in his play The Way of the World in 1700 as a simile (Witwoud - "Why, brother Wilfull of Salop, you may be as short as a Shrewsbury cake, if you please. But I tell you 'tis not modish to know relations in town"). 

The recipe is also included in several early cookbooks including The Compleat Cook of 1658, which gives the following instructions:

Although there are earlier references, Shrewsbury baker Thomas Plimmer claimed that he had acquired the original recipe from James Palin, who sold the cakes out of a bakeshop on Castle Street in Shrewsbury.

The recipe also appears in early American recipe collections. One 19th century American recipe is made with the creaming method to combine butter and sugar, typical for butter cakes, then adding eggs, rosewater, flour and nutmeg.

Other countries
Shrewsbury biscuits are popular in India, where they are locally produced in the Kayani Bakery located in Pune, Maharashtra.

See also
 Geographically indicated foods of the United Kingdom
 List of cakes

References

External links
History
Recipe
Recipe on BBC

British desserts
English cuisine
Biscuits
British cakes
Foods featuring butter
American cakes
Butter cakes